Alex Ngonga (born 21 August 1992) is a Zambian professional footballer who plays as a forward for Nkana F.C. and the Zambia national football team.

International career
Ngonga made his senior international debut on 28 April 2013 in a 2-0 friendly victory over Zimbabwe. He scored his first senior international goal on 20 July 2013 in a 2-0 win over Zimbabwe in the 2013 COSAFA Cup Final.

References

External links 
 
 

1992 births
Living people
Zambian footballers
Zambia international footballers
Association football forwards
Zambia A' international footballers
2018 African Nations Championship players
Expatriate footballers in Gabon
CF Mounana players
Nchanga Rangers F.C. players
Nkana F.C. players
Power Dynamos F.C. players
Zambian expatriate sportspeople in Gabon
Zambian expatriate footballers